St. John's Catholic High School is a private, Roman Catholic high school in Beloit, Kansas, United States.  The school is within the Roman Catholic Diocese of Salina.

History
Pioneer Catholic settlers in the Beloit area had a deep concern for the education of their children. In the fall of 1879 with 15 students, St. John's Catholic School was founded in a small one room building. By 1900, enrollment reached 140 students thus creating a need for a larger more structured school building. Local farmers quarried and hauled stone and sand to the present site. A German craftsman supervised construction of the present building that was completed in 1914.

The high school started in 1920 and occupied the same building until the present high school was built in 1952.

Today, the parish and families still hold the same passion to educate and form their children and grandchildren in the Catholic faith while giving them a complete and competitive education.

In March 2013, St. John's was selected as the Catholic School of the Month. This brought congratulations from Catholic dignitaries, authors, and others.

See also
 List of high schools in Kansas
 List of unified school districts in Kansas

References

External links
 School Website

Catholic secondary schools in Kansas
Schools in Mitchell County, Kansas
Educational institutions established in 1920
Roman Catholic Diocese of Salina
1920 establishments in Kansas